Santa Sofia a Via Boccea is a church in Rome, Italy. It is dedicated to Holy Wisdom ("Sancta Sophia" in Latin), one of the seven gifts of the Holy Spirit. It served as the mother church of the Ukrainian Greek Catholic Church while St. George's Cathedral in Lviv was controlled by the Russian Orthodox Church.

Description
The church is the national church for the Ukrainians in Rome, a meeting place and religious center for the community. The Divine Liturgy is celebrated according to the Byzantine-Ukrainian rite, whilst still in full communion with the Catholic Church.

The church was built in 1967–1968 on the orders of Cardinal Josyf Slipyj, the Major Archbishop of Lviv who had spent about 18 years in a Soviet gulag, and subsequently released but not allowed to return to Ukraine.

It is modeled after Kyiv's own Saint Sophia Cathedral. The relics of Pope Clement I (88-97) are kept in the church. Following the Byzantine rite, the church has an iconostasis, painted by Juvenalij Josyf Mokryckyj.

In 1985, Pope John Paul II erected the church as one of the titular churches suitable for a cardinal-priest.

In 1998 the church was raised to the status of a minor basilica.

Cardinal Priest title
The first Cardinal-Priest of Santa Sofia was Myroslav Cardinal Lubachivsky. Lubomyr Cardinal Husar, MSU, Major Archbishop of Kyiv-Halych, held the titular church from his appointment as a cardinal on 21 February 2001 until his death in 2017.

See also
 Santi Sergio e Bacco

References

External links
 

Sofia
Sofia
Sofia
Ukrainian Catholic churches in Italy
Roman Catholic churches completed in 1968
Ukrainian diaspora in Italy
20th-century Roman Catholic church buildings in Italy